Narela and sub-city is a tehsil, located in the North Delhi district of Delhi, and forms the border of Delhi with Haryana. Situated just off the Grand Trunk Road, its location made it an important market town for the surrounding areas, during the 19th century, which it still retains. It was developed as the third mega sub-city project of Delhi Development Authority (DDA) in the urban extension project of Delhi, after Rohini sub-city and Dwarka sub-city. It covers an area of 9866 hectares. The 'Narela Industrial Area' started developing in the early 1980s and is today one of the important such complexes in Delhi.

It is one of 12 zones of the Municipal Corporation of Delhi (MCD) and one of the three subdistricts of the North Delhi district, along with Alipur and Model Town.

History
There is a site in Narela Near Bhorgarh which dates back to the civilization of Harappa (Indus Valley civilization). City of Rohilla.

Sarai Narela was important sarai (caravan rest house) on the historic and ever busy Grand Trunk Road, that stretched all the way to Lahore and Kabul and the lifeline of the empire and important trade route. Even in the 13th century, during the days of Delhi Sultanate, Narela often became an encampment point, for marching or retreating armies from Delhi. Subsequently, during the Mughal era, The Narela Sarai also finds mention in Jahangirnama, the official autobiography of Mughal Emperor, Jahangir (1605-1627), as he mentions staying at the sarai, during his travels ca. 1605.

There is a famous pond (Talaab) in Narela and it remained full of water all the time. These days it has dried up and has been acquired by the DDA. From this pond, some coins of the time of Mohammad Shah Rangila have been found

There is a 30-year-old church (Narela church NICOG) located in the Gautam colony, Narela.

On 16 January 1757 in years preceding the Battle of Panipat (1761), in the Battle of Narela, the Maratha Army led by Antaji Mankeshwar, fought with an advance column of Ahmad Shah Abdali's army near Narela, and repulsed it.

In the mid-19th century, Narela was a tehsil and flourishing market town, and at 31.2 km was the nearest town to capital Delhi, and where people from neighbouring villages flocked to buy provisions and sell their agricultural produce and its Narela Mandi (agricultural market), a tradition which continues to date. By the early 20th century, it was a municipal town and a Civil Hospital was established by the District Board in 1913. After the World War I in 1919, Narela was declared a notified area by Delhi administration, earmarked for future development.

In 1860–61, the North-Western Provinces education system was abolished in Delhi, and Punjab education system was introduced with the opening of schools at Narela, Najafgarh, Mehrauli and their suburbs, several schools were opened here in the coming decades. The Hailey-Rifah-i-Am School was founded here in 1918, by Rifah-i-Am Society formed by local residents under the patronage of Lala Mussadi Lal, a noted social reformer. By 1920–1921, the society was running one middle school in Narela and two primary schools in Alipur and Kanjhawala and supported rural schools in Delhi Province. Swami Omanand Saraswati, a local zamindar and numberdar of villages, founded of Kanya Gurukul in Narela by donating his 70 acres (280,000 m2) of land at village., Lala Panna Lal Mangal(Kundli Wale) Freedom Fighter and Congress leader with Mahatma Gandhi,has died a decade ago.

Urban extension project
The project area is bounded by the Delhi-Haryana border in the North, Western Yamuna Canal in the West, GT Karnal road in the East and Badli-Auchandi Marg in the South East.

About 1000 ha land already acquired. More than 8000 residential flats of different categories have been constructed. About 1000 flats allotted to Delhi Police. About 900 plots of different sizes have been developed for alternative allotment/auction. Facility sites provided in Sector A7 & A8. IAMR complex of Planning Commission, GOI in a 16-acre plot in Sector A7 functional. 200 bedded Raja Harish Chander Govt. Hospital in Sector A7 completed. Recreational club site has been proposed for development in sector A7.

Land allotted for DTC terminal. Land allotted for Fire station. A Land for 80 m and 100 m roads from G.T. Karnal road (NH - 1) to Bawana industrial area has been acquired. Land proposed for National Science Park. Land for Integrated Freight Complex has been acquired.

Administration
From 1993 to 2008, it was Delhi Legislative Assembly segment within the East Delhi Lok Sabha constituency, prior to it, Narela remained a 1966–1993, a Delhi Metropolitan Council segment, with the same constituency. After the delimitation of 2008, Narela (Nerela) is now an Assembly segment within the North West Delhi Lok Sabha constituency. Presently, Sharad Chauhan of Aam Aadmi Party is the incumbent MLA from Narela constituency of Delhi Assembly, after the 2015 Delhi Legislative Assembly election.

Jayender Kumar Dabas is the chairman of Narela Zone of North Delhi Municipal Corporation.

The office of Sub Divisional Magistrate (SDM) (Narela), the head of Narela subdivision of North West Delhi district, is situated Block Development Officer (BDO) Office complex, at nearby Alipur, which is within the subdivision, along with Sub Registrar Office.

Geography

The time zone in Narela is Asia/Calcutta.
Sunrise at 07:12 and Sunset at 17:30.
Latitude. 28.85°, Longitude. 77.1°

Narela is divided into various colonies – Rajeev colony, Nai Basti, Punjabi colony, Gautam colony, Swatantra Nagar, Shivaji Colony, Master colony, Sanjay colony, Indra colony, Police colony, etc.
Narela has three main Pana – Pana Udyan, Pana paposiyan, Pana mamurpur, .

Demographics
As of 2011 Indian Census, the Narela sub-district had a total population of 809,913, of which 439,576 were males and 370,337 were females. The population within the age group of 0 to 6 years was 109,475. The total number of literates in Narela was 569,830, which constituted 70.3% of the population with male literacy of 75.9% and female literacy of 63.8%. The effective literacy rate of 7+ population of Narela was 81.4%, of which male literacy rate was 87.7% and the female literacy rate was 73.8%. The Scheduled Castes population was 155,299. Narela had 160132 households in 2011.

Accessibility
Its nearby towns are Alipur (9.9 km), Mukmelpur (10 km), Bawana (11.5 km) and Rāi (14.8 km). Located on the famed Grand Trunk Road, Narela is situated 14 km (8.7 miles) south of Sonipat, 42 km (26.3 miles) northwest of central Delhi, 100 km (62.2 miles) south of Karnal and 225 km (140 miles) southwest of Chandigarh. The Singhu Border is just 4 km (2.5 miles) away from Narela.

Narela (NUR) is a station of Indian Railways. The nearest airport is Indira Gandhi International Airport (DEL), in Delhi at the distance of 42.2 km, while the Badli station of Delhi Metro rail is the nearest station, though Narela sub-city is part of the Delhi Metro's Master Plan Phase IV, currently underway.

Areas in Narela Sub division

Bakhtawar Pur, Akbarpur Majra, Alipur,  Bakholi, Bankner, Bhor Garh, 
Lampur,Budhpur,Fatehpur Jat, Garhi Khasro, Gogha, Hamid Pur, Hiranki, Holambi Kalan, Holambi Khurd,Singhola, Iradat Nagar (Naya Bans),Tajpur,Tikri Khurd, Sanoth, Jhangola, Sungerpur, Jind Pur,Singhu, Khampur,Khera kalan, kureni.

References 

Map of Narela tehsil

External links
Narela.org All about Narela, Business In Narela, Places in Narela and Job offers
 Narela Business / Industrial Directory
Business Directory of Narela Sub City
Narela subdivision in map of North West Delhi District at Government of Delhi website
Narela at wikimapia

North West Delhi district
Neighbourhoods in Delhi
Cities and towns in North West Delhi district
District subdivisions of Delhi